Revelator may refer to:
Any agent in a revelation, a deity or other supernatural entity or entities revealing or disclosing some form of truth or knowledge
Prophet, seer, and revelator, an ecclesiastical title used in The Church of Jesus Christ of Latter-day Saints

The Revelator, an online news and ideas initiative of the Center for Biological Diversity, provides investigative reporting, analysis and stories at the intersection of politics, conservation, art, culture, endangered species, climate change, economics and the future of wild species, wild places and the planet.

Art, entertainment, and media

Music
Albums
Revelator (Phil Keaggy album), a 1993 album by Phil Keaggy
Time (The Revelator), a 2001 album by Gillian Welch
Revelator (Tedeschi Trucks Band album), a 2011 album by the Tedeschi Trucks Band

Songs
The Revelator, song by Angels & Airwaves from their album Love: Part Two
"John the Revelator" (song)

Television
"The Revelator" (Sons of Anarchy), the season 1 finale episode of Sons of Anarchy

Video Games
Guilty Gear Xrd -REVELATOR-, an update/sequel to the 2014 fighting game Guilty Gear Xrd -SIGN-

Other
Revelator Coffee, a coffee company